Emily Wilson may refer to:

 Emily Wilson (classicist) (born 1971), British classicist and professor
 Emily Wilson (actress) (born 1985), American actress
 Emily Wilson (journalist), editor of New Scientist magazine
 Emily Wilson (footballer) (born 2001), Northern Irish footballer
 Emily Wilson (gymnast) (born 2004), American rhythmic gymnast
 Emily Wilson Walker (1904–2007), American medical doctor